The Pharmacist is a 1997 German comedy film based on the eponymous novel by Ingrid Noll.

Cast 
 Katja Riemann – Hella Moormann
 Jürgen Vogel – Levin Graber
 Richy Müller – Dieter Krosmansky
  – Margot Krosmansky
 August Zirner – Pawel Siebert
 Dagmar Manzel – Dorit Meissen
 Andrea Sawatzki – Alma Siebert
  – Hermann Graber
  – Gero
 Eva Ingeborg Scholz – Gudrun Moormann
 Friedrich von Thun – Rolf Moormann
  – Bob Moormann
 Dominic Raacke – Kripobeamter

References

External links 

1997 films
1997 comedy films
German comedy films
1990s German films